Pūjari is a designation given to a Hindu temple priest who performs pūja. The word comes from the Sanskrit word "पूजा" meaning worship. They are responsible for performing temple rituals, including pūjā and aarti. Pujari are mainly drawn from the Hindu Brahmin and Billava

History

See also
Goswami
Pandit
Purohit
Yogi
''Bairagi

References

External links

Indian surnames

Hindu priests
Titles and occupations in Hinduism